The 14th congressional district of Illinois is currently represented by Democrat Lauren Underwood.  It is located in northern Illinois, surrounding the outer northern and western suburbs of Chicago.

Geographic boundaries

2011 redistricting
After the 2011 redistricting which followed the 2010 census, meaning from the 2012 election on, the congressional district covers parts of the counties of DeKalb, DuPage, Kane, Kendall, Lake, McHenry and Will.  The district includes all or parts of the cities of Aurora, Batavia, Campton Hills, Crystal Lake, Geneva, Huntley, McHenry, Naperville, St. Charles, North Aurora, Oswego, Plainfield, Plano, Sycamore, Warrenville, Wauconda, Woodstock, and Yorkville.

2021 redistricting

As of the 2020 redistricting, the district will be based in Northern Illinois, and takes in Kendall, the southern half of DeKalb county, northern LaSalle County, northeast Putnam County, and part of Will, Kane, and Bureau Counties.

DeKalb County is split between this district, the 11th district, and the 16th district. They are partitioned by Gillis Rd, Anjali Ct, W Mortel Rd, Kishwaukee River, Bass Line Rd, Illinois Highway 23, Whipple Rd, Plank Rd, Swanson Rd, and Darnell Rd. The 14th district takes in the municipalities of Sycamore, DeKalb, and Sandwich.

Bureau County is split between this district and the 16th district. They are partitioned by Illinois Highway 26, US Highway 180, 2400 St E, and 2400 Ave N. The 14th district takes in the municipalities of Spring Valley, Cherry, DePue, Ladd, and Seatonville.

Putnam County is split between this district and the 16th district. They are partitioned by Illinois River, S Front St, E High St, N 2nd St, E Court St, E Mulberry St, N 3rd St, N 4th St, N 6th St, E Sycamore St, S 5th St, Coffee Creek, Illinois Highway 26, and N 600th Ave. The 14th district takes in the municipalities of Granville and Standard; and most of Hennepin.

LaSalle County is split between this district and the 16th district. They are partitioned by N 20th Rd, Vermillion River, Mattiiessen State Park Central Road, E 8th Rd, N 24th Rd, E 12th Rd, N 2250th Rd, E 13th Rd, E 18th Rd, Oakwood Dr, and the Illinois River. The 14th district takes in the municipalities of LaSalle, Ottawa, Oglesby, Peru, Earlville, and Mendota; and half of Seneca.

Will County is split between this district, the 1st district, and the 11th district. The 14th and 1st districts are partitioned by West 135th St, High Rd, Chicago Sanitary & Ship Canal, Thornton St, East 9th St, Madison St, East 12th St, East Division St, South Farrell Rd, Midewin National Tail Grass Prairie, West Schweizer Rd, Channahon Rd, DuPage River, and Canal Road North. The 14th and 11th districts are partitioned by The 14th takes in the municipalities of Joliet and Plainfield; most of Romeoville; and half of Lockport.

Recent statewide election results

Representation
Joseph Gurney Cannon, who also served as Speaker of the United States House of Representatives during four congresses and after whom the Cannon House Office Building is named, represented the district early in his career (1873–83), although he was representing the  when he was speaker from 1903 to 1911.

The 14th district was represented from 1987 to 2007 by Republican Dennis Hastert, who served as Speaker of the House during the 106th through 109th congresses.

Hastert resigned from Congress in November 2007 and on March 8, 2008 the 2008 Illinois's 14th congressional district special election was held  to fill the vacancy. Democrat Bill Foster defeated Republican Jim Oberweis by 52.5% to 47.5%. In the November 2008 regular election, Foster won a full two-year term, defeating Oberweis once again.

Foster failed to win re-election in 2010. Republican Randy Hultgren won the seat for the GOP and was sworn in when the 112th Congress convened. Hultgren was re-elected in the 2012 election, the 2014 election, and the 2016 election.

In the 2018 election, Democratic nominee Lauren Underwood defeated Hultgren, 52.5 to 47.5 percent, thus flipping the Cook Partisan Voting Index Republican +5 district to the Democratic Party.

Recent election results

2012 election 

Incumbent Randy Hultgren defeated Democratic challenger Dennis Anderson to keep his spot in the House of Representatives.

2014 election 

This election was a repeat of the 2012 election, and Hultgren retained his seat.

2016 election 

Hultgren wins again, this time against Democrat Jim Walz.

2018 election 

Hultgren lost his releection bid to Democrat Lauren Underwood.

2020 election

2022 election

List of members representing the district

See also
 Illinois's 14th congressional district special election, 2008
 Illinois's congressional districts
 List of United States congressional districts

References

 
 
 Congressional Biographical Directory of the United States 1774–present

External links
 Washington Post page on the 14th District of Illinois
 U.S. Census Bureau - 14th District Fact Sheet 

14
DuPage County, Illinois
Kane County, Illinois
DeKalb County, Illinois
Constituencies established in 1873
1873 establishments in Illinois